Asuboi is a town in the Suhum/Kraboa/Coaltar district in the Eastern Region of Ghana. It is along the Accra–Kumasi N6 highway close to the Techimanti community.

See also

References

External links

Populated places in the Eastern Region (Ghana)